Småland and the islands is a National Area of Sweden. The National Areas are a part of the NUTS statistical regions of Sweden. The name derives from the fact that the area covers most of the historical province of Småland with the island provinces of Öland and Gotland, located in the Baltic Sea.

Geography
The Småland and the islands area is situated in the south-eastern part of Sweden. It is close to Denmark and it borders the riksområden of East Middle Sweden, West Sweden and South Sweden.

The most populous cities are Jönköping, Växjö, Kalmar, Visby, Västervik and Värnamo.

Economy 
The Gross domestic product (GDP) of the region was 37.886 billion € in 2021, accounting for 7.4% of Swedish economic output. GDP per capita adjusted for purchasing power was 32,100 € or 106% of the EU27 average in the same year. The GDP per employee was 99% of the EU average.

Subdivision
Småland and the islands includes 4 counties:

See also

References

External links